Golden Island Shopping Centre is a shopping centre located on the outskirts of Athlone, County Westmeath, Ireland.

History 
The centre, which stands on the townland of Goldenisland (Kilmaine), was developed on the site of a former landfill by Owen O'Callaghan, Michael Tiernan and Tom Diskin. Aiming to attract more business to the Midland Region of Ireland, the centre opened in October 1997, and has gained a footfall of 65,000 a week.

Over three years later, on 1 May 2019, the centre was once again put on sale by Credit Suisse for €41 million.

Stores 
The centre contains 45 stores, ranging from clothing to health, mobile phone providers and a supermarket. Of the clothing, there is a large Penneys, as well as smaller units such as Diesel. There are many restaurants and cafés in the mall, including Costa Coffee, Burger King and Insomnia. At the eastern end of the mall is a large Tesco, selling food and clothes.

Cinema 
The shopping centre also contains an IMC cinema, which opened in 1998 with six screens and a capacity of 871 seats.

References

Buildings and structures in Athlone
Shopping centres in the Republic of Ireland